Loc-Eguiner is a commune in the Finistère department of Brittany in north-western France.

Population
Inhabitants of Loc-Eguiner are called in French Loguisiens.

See also
Communes of the Finistère department
Loc-Eguiner Parish close

References

External links

Mayors of Finistère Association 

Communes of Finistère